The Chiyoda armoured car was the first domestic Japanese armoured car which was officially introduced by the Imperial Japanese Army (IJA) and produced in the 1930s.

History and development
Design started in 1930 at the Chiyoda Motor Car Factory of Tokyo Gasu Denki K. K. (Tokyo Gas and Electric Industries, today Hino Motors Ltd.) based on their Type Q 6-wheeled truck under the development designation "Type QSW". It had a 4 cylinder petrol engine that produced 75 power hp and a weight ratio of 13.4 hp/t.

The armour scheme and wheel arrangement was similar to the Wolseley armoured car which had been used by the army. The four spoke wheels of the Wolseleys were replaced by six disk wheels with solid rubber tires. The turret had a cylindrical base with a sloped (in the driving direction) right upper part. A machine gun mount was placed in this sloped section for air defense. Another MG mount was placed in the front of the turret and a third in the left bow. In addition three gun–visor ports were positioned on each side of the fighting compartment. It had a crew of five, consisting of a driver, three gunners and a commander. Armament consisted of three Type 11 6.5 mm machine guns.

It entered service in 1931 and the vehicle was officially adopted as the "Chiyoda armoured car". In western literature the vehicle is often designated incorrectly as "Aikoku Armoured Car" which is a misinterpretation of the writings on a vehicle used during the 1932 Shanghai Incident. This writing refers to "Aikoku -Koto" = "Public Party of Patriots", a nationalistic and militaristic political party which donated money and military material to IJA (as Hokoku did for the Imperial Japanese Navy (IJN)). It has also been referred to as the Type 92 "Chiysda", which is only a misspelling. The version used by the IJN was known as the Type 2592 and had a six-cylinder engine producing 85 hp. They were used during several early and mid-1930s operations in northern China for infantry support and security duties in captured regions. A total of 200 Chiyoda armoured cars were produced.

Gallery

Notes

References
Taki's Imperial Japanese Army Page - Akira Takizawa

Armoured cars of Japan
Armoured cars of the interwar period
Isuzu
Toyota Group
Military vehicles introduced in the 1930s